Edward Norris Ratcliff (born March 5, 1983) is a retired American professional mixed martial artist. A professional competitor from 2005 until 2010, he fought in the WEC.

Background
Originally from Chicago, Illinois, Ratcliff is African-American but is also of Iroquois Native American descent. Ratcliff was raised alongside his sister by his single mother, Laceine. It was Ratfcliff's mother who was his original martial arts instructor. In elementary school, Ratcliff began Tae Kwon Do and would eventually earn black belts in both disciplines. At the age of 17, Ratcliff tried out to be a part of Ken Shamrock's gym The Lion's Den in 2001 and made the team.

Mixed martial arts career

Early career
Ratcliff made his professional MMA debut in 2005 and compiled an undefeated professional record of 4-0 before being signed by the WEC.

World Extreme Cagefighting
Ratcliff debuted at WEC 27, defeating Johnny Sampaio via TKO (knees) in the second round.

Next, he faced Ultimate Fighter alumni Alex Karalexis and was again victorious via technical knockout. However, Ratcliff suffered his first WEC and professional loss at WEC 33 at the hands of Marcus Hicks via guillotine choke.

Ratcliff then bounced back against Phil Cardella, winning via unanimous decision.

He lost his last fight against Donald Cerrone via submission at WEC 45 on December 19, 2009.

Ratcliff was expected to face Chris Horodecki on June 20, 2010 at WEC 49, but just days before the event, Ratcliff pulled out of the event for undisclosed reasons.  Horodecki instead faced WEC newcomer Danny Downes.

The fight between Horodecki and Ratcliff eventually took place on September 30, 2010 at WEC 51.  He lost the fight via split decision.

Ratcliff was released by UFC/Zuffa in January 2011.

Championships and accomplishments
World Extreme Cagefighting
Fight of the Night (One time) vs. Donald Cerrone

Mixed martial arts record

| Loss
| align=center| 7–3
| Chris Horodecki
| Decision (split)
| WEC 51
| 
| align=center| 3
| align=center| 5:00
| Broomfield, Colorado, United States
| 
|-
| Loss
| align=center| 7–2
| Donald Cerrone
| Submission (rear naked choke)
| WEC 45
| 
| align=center| 3
| align=center| 3:47
| Las Vegas, Nevada, United States
| Fight of the Night.
|-
| Win
| align=center| 7–1
| Phil Cardella
| Decision (unanimous)
| WEC 42
| 
| align=center| 3
| align=center| 5:00
| Las Vegas, Nevada, United States
| 
|-
| Loss
| align=center| 6–1
| Marcus Hicks
| Submission (guillotine choke)
| WEC 33: Marshall vs. Stann
| 
| align=center| 1
| align=center| 1:42
| Las Vegas, Nevada, United States
| 
|-
| Win
| align=center| 6–0
| Alex Karalexis
| TKO (punches)
| WEC 31
| 
| align=center| 2
| align=center| 1:26
| Las Vegas, Nevada, United States
| 
|-
| Win
| align=center| 5–0
| Johnny Sampaio
| TKO (knees)
| WEC 27
| 
| align=center| 2
| align=center| 5:00
| Las Vegas, Nevada, United States
| 
|-
| Win
| align=center| 4–0
| Chris Reed
| TKO (corner stoppage)
| TC 18: Nightmare
| 
| align=center| 2
| align=center| 5:00
| San Diego, California, United States
| 
|-
| Win
| align=center| 3–0
| Jamie Schmidt
| TKO (strikes)
| TC 14: Throwdown
| 
| align=center| 2
| align=center| 1:14
| Del Mar, California, United States
|Return to Lightweight.
|-
| Win
| align=center| 2–0
| Brett Cooper
| KO (spinning heel kick)
| TC 12: Total Combat 12
| 
| align=center| 2
| align=center| N/A
| Tijuana, Mexico
|Welterweight debut.
|-
| Win
| align=center| 1–0
| Josh Olivas
| Submission (armbar)
| TC 9: Total Combat 9
| 
| align=center| 1
| align=center| N/A
| Tijuana, Mexico
|

References

External links
 

1983 births
American male mixed martial artists
African-American mixed martial artists
Mixed martial artists utilizing taekwondo
Mixed martial artists utilizing karate
Living people
American male karateka
American male taekwondo practitioners
21st-century African-American sportspeople
20th-century African-American people